Hanna-Barbera Educational Filmstrips is a series of animated filmstrips of educational material produced by Hanna-Barbera Productions' educational division. The series ran from 1977 to 1980 for a total of 26 titles, featuring the studio's animated characters from The Flintstones, The Yogi Bear Show, The Jetsons, Scooby-Doo, Where Are You!, The Banana Splits, Cattanooga Cats, and Jabberjaw.

The series was designed for elementary- and secondary-school children and distributed in classroom environments by RADMAR, Inc. Each audiovisual package consisted of two filmstrips in plastic cases featuring high-quality 35 mm images of Hanna-Barbera characters, cassette tapes, and a teacher's guide booklet. The voices for the animated characters were provided by the same voice actors from their respective television series.

Robert Letro, Supervisor of Teacher Education and Director of Educational Media Laboratory at the University of California in Irvine, California, served as educational advisor for the series, while Art Scott served as production director, writer, and production supervisor for Hanna-Barbera Educational Division.

Filmstrips

Voice cast
Daws Butler as Yogi Bear, Elroy Jetson and Bingo
Henry Corden as Fred Flintstone
Casey Kasem as Shaggy Rogers
Allan Melvin as Drooper
Don Messick as Bamm-Bamm Rubble, Boo-Boo Bear, George Jetson, Scooby-Doo, Finny and Hoppy
Patricia Parris as Shelly, Velma Dinkley, Pebbles Flintstone
John Stephenson as Barney Rubble
Janet Waldo as Pebbles Flintstone and Jenny
Frank Welker as Jabberjaw
Paul Winchell as Fleegle

Production crew
Coordinator of Educational Programs: Robert Letro (University of California)
Educational Advisors: Robert Letro, Billie Letro, Ruth Ann Stamm, Alan Massengale, Dolores Lawler (University of California)
Production Supervisor: Gary M. Stamm (University of California)
Writers: Gary M. Stamm, Sloan Nibley, Dolores Lawler (University of California)
Production Director: Art Scott (Hanna-Barbera)
Production Designers: Jack Manning, W.R. Kowalchuk, Peter Alvarado, Alex Toth, Frank C. Smith, Homer Jonas, Don Holcombe (Hanna-Barbera)
Published by: Barr Films (Pasadena, California)
Distributed by: RADMAR, Inc.

Other Hanna-Barbera filmstrip titles

Xerox Filmstrip Set

Learning Tree Filmstrip Set

See also
 List of works produced by Hanna-Barbera Productions

References

1970s animated short films
1980s animated short films
1970s educational films
1980s educational films
Hanna-Barbera
Hanna-Barbera animated films
The Flintstones television specials
Yogi Bear television specials
Scooby-Doo specials
The Jetsons films
The Banana Splits
1980s English-language films
1970s English-language films
1970s American films
1980s American films
American educational films